The 1958 Swedish speedway season was the 1958 season of motorcycle speedway in Sweden.

Individual

Individual Championship
The 1958 Swedish Individual Speedway Championship final was held on 3 October in Stockholm. Rune Sörmander won the Swedish Championship for the second time.

Junior Championship
 

The 1958 season saw the introduction of the first edition of the Junior Championship. The event was won by Agnar Stenlund.

Team

Team Championship
Dackarna won division 1 for the second consecutive season and were declared the winners of the Swedish Speedway Team Championship. The team retained the 1957 Championship winning rider and Swedish champion Rune Sörmander.

The league increased to two divisions and ten teams following the admission of Örnarna and Folkare and the addition of two B sides in Filbyterna and Dackarna.

Örnarna won the second division.

See also 
 Speedway in Sweden

References

Speedway leagues
Professional sports leagues in Sweden
Swedish
Seasons in Swedish speedway